The Inter-Allied Victory Medal is a campaign medal issued by Greece, commemorating the Allied victory in the First World War.

Greek award
The medal is the Greek version of a common design used among all Allied nations, following a proposal made by Marshal Ferdinand Foch, who was supreme commander of the Allied Forces during the war. In Greece, the medal was instituted by Law 2481 on 22 September 1920 (O.S.).

Each medal, in bronze, has the same diameter (36 mm) and ribbon (double rainbow), but with a national design representing a winged Victory. The Greek version of the medal was designed by Henry-Eugène Nocq.

It features an ancient Greek-style Victory on the obverse, and on the reverse the circular inscription  ('The Great War for Civilisation, 1914–1918') around the edge, and in the centre a list of the Allied nations, under the title  ('Allies and Partners'). It was widely awarded to Greek military personnel that fought for at least three months, or was wounded in action, not only in the First World War, but also in the Allies' Southern Russia intervention, and the Greco-Turkish War of 1919–1922.

International award

(Main source : The interallied victory medals of world war I by Alexander J. Laslo, Dorado Publishing, Albuquerque. 1986 Edition )

References

Sources
 George J. Beldecos, "Hellenic Orders, Decorations and Medals", pub. Hellenic War Museum, Athens 1991, .

External links

 Inter-Allied Victory Medal, Greek official issue, 1914-1918

Interallied Victory Medals of World War I
Military awards and decorations of Greece
1920 establishments in Greece
Greece in World War I
Awards established in 1920